Deep Down is a 1994 American erotic thriller film directed by John Travers and starring George Segal, Tanya Roberts, and Chris Young. The alternative title is Conversations in Public Places.

Plot
A young man, Andy, comes to California, hoping to become a rock musician. He stays in a small house with a swimming pool, renting a room from a man who believed in his debt. There he meets a beautiful woman, Charlotte, who lives with a fierce and jealous husband much older than her. Charlotte seduces Andy, but later this affair proves to be far more sinister as she in fact wants to get rid of her husband.

Cast
George Segal as Gil
Roderick Thorp as Cook 
Chris Young as Andy
Mathew Valencia as Boy
Lisa Rhoden as Holly
Kristoffer Tabori as Craig
Tanya Roberts as Charlotte
Paul Le Mat as Ray
James Farentino as Joey

References

External links
 
 
 
 

1994 films
American erotic thriller films
1990s English-language films
1990s American films